Rodney Martin (born 17 October 1965) is an Australian former professional squash player, who is best known for winning the 1991 World Open and becoming the first player to defeat Jahangir Khan and Jansher Khan in the same event. After retiring as a player due to injury, he became a squash coach, working in Australia and the United States.

Biography
Martin comes from one of squash's most successful families. His older brother Brett Martin and younger sister Michelle Martin were also top professional players. He grew up in the Sydney suburb of Engadine, where his parents built the local squash centre under their family home. He moved to Brisbane in his early teens and went to school at Everton Park State High School in Brisbane. He began his squash career in 1984 and shortly afterwards began attending the Australian Institute of Sport. His first major victory at an international competition was at the 1985 Australian Open. Martin was runner-up at the British Open three times in 1988–1990 (losing to Pakistani player Jahangir Khan in the final on all three occasions).

He is best known for winning the World Open in 1991, beating Jahangir Khan in the final 14–17, 15–9, 15–4, 15–13 (he had previously beaten another Pakistani player, Jansher Khan, in the quarter-finals, and his Australian compatriot Chris Dittmar in the semi-finals). He became the first person to defeat Jahangir and Jansher Khan in the same event. Martin also won the Australian Open in 1986, 1990, 1992, and 1993, the Hong Kong Open in 1986 and 1992, and the United States Open in 1989 and 1991; he was part of the Australian teams that won the World Team Squash Championships in 1989 in Singapore and 1991 in Helsinki.

In 1993, Martin married fellow Australian squash player Danielle Drady, with whom he had been in a long-term relationship, but their marriage ended the next year after she left him for his manager Phil Harte (who also managed Martin's sister Michelle). Martin later partially won a court case in the Supreme Court of New South Wales against Harte and two other directors over their management of the Australian Squash Club. Martin was forced to retire from the international tour in 1995 due to a hip injury. After retiring as a player, he became a squash coach, working with the Australian Institute of Sport from 1996 to 2010 and then setting up his own business in the US state of Connecticut, Rodney Martin Squash. In Australia he coached such players as his sister Michelle, Stewart Boswell, Anthony Ricketts, Paul Price, Dan Jenson, Cameron Pilley, and Kasey Brown. Some of the players he has coached since moving to the US include Mohamed El Shorbagy, Ryan Cuskelly, Zac Alexander, Abdulla Al-Tamimi, Peter Creed, Chris Hanson, and Christopher Binnie. He is married to squash player Amelia Pittock and they have a son.

Recognition
Martin received an Australian Sports Medal in 2000 and was inducted into the Squash Australia Hall of Fame in 2007.

References

External links 
Official website
 

Australian male squash players
Australian Institute of Sport squash players
Squash coaches
Sportspeople from Sydney
Sportspeople from Brisbane
Australian expatriate sportspeople in the United States
Recipients of the Australian Sports Medal
1965 births
Living people